Eric Harding (born December 20, 1972) is an American former professional boxer who fought at light heavyweight.

Career
Harding turned pro in 1991 and was undefeated in his first 20 fights.  These wins included a fight in which he defeated future champion Montell Griffin by split decision to win the NABF light heavyweight title on Nov 13, 1998, and a unanimous decision over then undefeated contender Antonio Tarver on June 23, 2000.

His streak came to an end when he fought Roy Jones Jr. for the WBC, WBA, & IBF light heavyweight titles on Sept. 9, 2000.  He lost by technical knockout (the fight was stopped after the 10th round by the ringside doctor due to Harding suffering from a torn biceps muscle), but after the fight Jones Jr. said it was his most difficult fight to date.

On Feb. 11, 2005 he defeated David Telesco to claim the vacant USBA light heavyweight title, but lost the title the following year to Chad Dawson by decision, despite dropping Dawson in the 1st round.

Professional boxing record

|-
|style="text-align:center;" colspan=8|23 Wins (7 knockouts, 16 decisions), 4 Losses (2 knockouts, 2 decisions), 1 Draw
|- style="text-align:center; background:#e3e3e3;"
| style="border-style: none none solid solid; "|Result
| style="border-style: none none solid solid; "|Record
| style="border-style: none none solid solid; "|Opponent
| style="border-style: none none solid solid; "|Type
| style="border-style: none none solid solid; "|Round, Time
| style="border-style: none none solid solid; "|Date
| style="border-style: none none solid solid; "|Location
| style="border-style: none none solid solid; "|Notes
|-align=center
|Loss
|
|align=left| Chad Dawson
|
|
|
|align=left| Chumash Casino, Santa Ynez, California
|align=left|
|-align=center
|Win
|
|align=left| Daniel Judah
|
|
|
|align=left| Mohegan Sun, Uncasville, Connecticut
|align=left|
|-align=center
|Win
|
|align=left| David Telesco
|
|
|
|align=left| Mohegan Sun, Uncasville, Connecticut
|align=left|
|-align=center
|Loss
|
|align=left| Glen "Road Warrior" Johnson
|
|
|
|align=left| Jimmy's Bronx Cafe, Bronx, New York
|align=left|
|-align=center
|Loss
|
|align=left| Antonio Tarver
|
|
|
|align=left| Conseco Fieldhouse, Indianapolis, Indiana
|align=left|
|-align=center
|Win
|
|align=left| George Khalid Jones
|
|
|
|align=left| Mohegan Sun, Uncasville, Connecticut
|align=left|
|-align=center
|Win
|
|align=left| Demetrius Jenkins
|
|
|
|align=left| Grand Casino Gulfport, Gulfport, Mississippi
|align=left|
|-align=center
|Loss
|
|align=left| Roy Jones Jr.
|
|
|
|align=left| New Orleans Arena, New Orleans, Louisiana
|align=left|
|-align=center
|Win
|
|align=left| Antonio Tarver
|
|
|
|align=left| Grand Casino Biloxi, Biloxi, Mississippi
|align=left|
|-align=center
|Win
|
|align=left| Leon A. Gray
|
|
|
|align=left| Pechanga Resort and Casino, Temecula, California
|align=left|
|-align=center
|Win
|
|align=left| "Sting" Ray Berry
|
|
|
|align=left| Hauppauge, New York
|align=left|
|-align=center
|Win
|
|align=left| Pascal David
|
|
|
|align=left| Eastwood Theatre, Hartford, Connecticut
|align=left|
|-align=center
|Win
|
|align=left| Montell Griffin
|
|
|
|align=left| Miccosukee Resort and Gaming, Miami, Florida
|align=left|
|-align=center
|Win
|
|align=left| Dave "The Hammer" Hamilton
|
|
|
|align=left| Fleet Center, Boston, Massachusetts
|align=left|
|-align=center
|Win
|
|align=left| Levan Easley
|
|
|
|align=left| Foxwoods, Mashantucket, Connecticut
|align=left|
|-align=center
|Win
|
|align=left| Richard "The Alien" Grant
|
|
|
|align=left| Dressler Arena, Hartford, Connecticut
|align=left|
|-align=center
|Win
|
|align=left| Steve Detar
|
|
|
|align=left| Foxwoods, Mashantucket, Connecticut
|align=left|
|-align=center
|Win
|
|align=left| Kabary Salem
|
|
|
|align=left| Saratoga Performing Arts Center, Saratoga Springs, New York
|align=left|
|-align=center
|Win
|
|align=left| Beethaeven Scottland
|
|
|
|align=left| Dressler Arena, Hartford, Connecticut
|align=left|
|-align=center
|Win
|
|align=left| Hector Sanjurjo
|
|
|
|align=left| Foxwoods, Mashantucket, Connecticut
|align=left|
|-align=center
|Win
|
|align=left| Beethaeven Scottland
|
|
|
|align=left| Mohegan Sun, Uncasville, Connecticut
|align=left|
|-align=center
|Win
|
|align=left| "Mr." Ed Bryant
|
|
|
|align=left| Foxwoods, Mashantucket, Connecticut
|align=left|
|-align=center
|Win
|
|align=left| Roberto Perez
|
|
|
|align=left| Foxwoods, Mashantucket, Connecticut
|align=left|
|-align=center
|Win
|
|align=left| Junior Neequaye
|
|
|
|align=left| Caesars Atlantic City, Atlantic City, New Jersey
|align=left|
|-align=center
|Win
|
|align=left| Pat Pernsley
|
|
|
|align=left| The Blue Horizon, Philadelphia, Pennsylvania
|align=left|
|-align=center
|Win
|
|align=left| Reinaldo Almodovar
|
|
|
|align=left| The Blue Horizon, Philadelphia, Pennsylvania
|align=left|
|-align=center
|Win
|
|align=left| Jermain Dixon
|
|
|
|align=left| The Blue Horizon, Philadelphia, Pennsylvania
|align=left|
|-align=center
|Win
|
|align=left| Robert "Doubting" Thomas
|
|
|
|align=left| Philadelphia, Pennsylvania
|align=left|
|}

References

External links 
 

Boxers from Philadelphia
Light-heavyweight boxers
Southpaw boxers
1972 births
Living people
American male boxers